Kerala State Transport Employees Front is a trade union of Kerala State Road Transport Corporation employees in Kerala, India. It is affiliated to the Kerala Trade Union Congress (Balakrishnan).

Trade unions in India
Trade unions in Kerala
Road transport trade unions
Transport trade unions in India
Year of establishment missing